Berlin, also known as the Long-a-Coming Depot, is located in Berlin, Camden County, New Jersey, United States, between East Taunton and Washington Avenues, abutting the New Jersey Transit Atlantic City Line tracks. The station was built in 1856 and added to the National Register of Historic Places on February 14, 1997 for its significance in transportation.

History
The Camden and Atlantic Railroad built a rail line in 1853 that ran parallel to the main road between Philadelphia, Pennsylvania and Atlantic City, New Jersey. The station was built along the rail line in 1856. In 1867, the station name was changed to Berlin. The station was closed in the 1960s due to declining passenger numbers. The PRSL attempted to demolish the station in 1968, but was unsuccessful.

The station was restored in 1994 by the Long-a-Coming Historical Society. The station now serves as the meeting place for the historical society and several other area organizations.

See also
List of the oldest buildings in New Jersey
National Register of Historic Places listings in Camden County, New Jersey

References

Berlin, New Jersey
Railway stations in Camden County, New Jersey
Railway stations on the National Register of Historic Places in New Jersey
Former railway stations in New Jersey
Former Pennsylvania-Reading Seashore Lines stations
National Register of Historic Places in Camden County, New Jersey
New Jersey Register of Historic Places
1856 establishments in New Jersey
Railway stations in the United States opened in 1856